Jonathan Alejandro Monsalve Pertsinidis (born 28 June 1989) is a Venezuelan road cyclist, who is currently suspended from the sport after testing positive for anabolic–androgenic steroids (AAS). He is the younger brother of fellow racing cyclist Ralph Monsalve.

Major results

2008
 10th Overall Vuelta a Venezuela
2009
 1st  Road race, National Under-23 Road Championships
 2nd Coppa Colli Briantei
 3rd Overall Vuelta al Táchira
1st  Points classification
1st  Young rider classification
1st Combination classification
1st Stages 3 & 12
 9th Trofeo Banca Popolare di Vicenza
2010
 1st  Road race, National Under-23 Road Championships
 1st Stage 8 Girobio
 2nd Overall Giro della Valle d'Aosta
1st Stage 2
 4th Trofeo Franco Balestra
 5th Gran Premio della Liberazione
 8th Overall Vuelta al Táchira
1st Stage 7
 8th Trofeo Banca Popolare di Vicenza
2011
 1st  Overall Tour de Langkawi
1st  Mountains classification
1st Stage 5
2012
 7th Trofeo Matteotti
 8th Road race, Pan American Road Championships
 9th Circuito de Getxo
 10th Gran Premio Industria e Commercio di Prato
2013
 9th Overall Vuelta a Venezuela
2014
 1st  Mountains classification Giro del Trentino
 9th Overall Vuelta a Venezuela
1st Stage 3
2015
 1st Stage 10 Vuelta al Táchira
2016
 1st  Overall Vuelta a Venezuela
1st  Points classification
1st Stage 2
 3rd  Road race, Pan American Road Championships
 5th Overall Tour du Maroc
 9th Overall Vuelta al Táchira
2017
 1st  Overall Tour of Qinghai Lake
 1st Stage 1 Vuelta a Venezuela
 3rd Overall Tour de Singkarak
1st Stage 5
 4th Overall Vuelta al Táchira
1st Points classification
1st Stage 3
2018
 1st Stage 10 Vuelta al Táchira
 9th Overall Tour of Qinghai Lake
2019
 1st Stage 4 Vuelta al Táchira
8th Overall Tour of Qinghai Lake

References

External links
 
 
 
Jonathan Monsalve's profile at Cycling Base
 
 
 

1989 births
Living people
Venezuelan male cyclists
Place of birth missing (living people)
Cyclists at the 2016 Summer Olympics
Olympic cyclists of Venezuela
Sportspeople from Maracaibo